Goli Krš (Serbian Cyrillic: Голи Крш) is a mountain in eastern Serbia, near the city of Bor. Its highest peak has an elevation of 887 meters above sea level.

References

Mountains of Serbia